Charlie Shoemake (born July 27, 1937) is an American jazz vibraphonist. He played in George Shearing's Quintet for seven years, starting in 1967. He also played vibes on the soundtrack of the Clint Eastwood film Bird. He is the director of the Central Coast Jazz Institute in Cambria, California. 

His wife, Sandi Shoemake, is a jazz singer and sings on many of his albums.

References

External links
Official website for Charlie and Sandi Shoemake
Central Coast Jazz Institute

1937 births
Living people
Musicians from Houston
American vibraphonists